The University of Poitiers (UP) is a public university located in Poitiers, France. It is a member of the Coimbra Group. It is multidisciplinary and contributes to making Poitiers the city with the highest student/inhabitant ratio in France by welcoming nearly 28,000 students in 2017.

The University of Poitiers represents a global operating budget of around 150 million euros per year, one-third of which is for operating and investment costs and two-thirds for personnel costs. As of July 2015 it is a member of the regional university association
Leonardo da Vinci consolidated University.

History
Founded in 1431 by Pope Eugene IV and chartered by King Charles VII, the University of Poitiers was originally composed of five faculties: theology, canon law, civil law, medicine, and arts.

In the 16th century, the university exerted its influence over the town cultural life, and was ranked second only to Paris. Of the 4,000 students who attended it at the time, some were to become famous: Joachim Du Bellay, Jean-Louis Guez de Balzac, François Rabelais, René Descartes, and Scévole de Sainte-Marthe, to name but a few.

After temporary closure during the French Revolution when provincial universities were abolished, the University of Poitiers reopened in 1796. The reinstated university was merged from several schools and contained new faculties such as the faculty of science and the faculty of letters.

They established the École nationale supérieure d'ingénieurs de Poitiers, a department which trains engineers, in 1984 after having created the Institut de sciences et techniques de Poitiers, its predecessor.

The first Confucius Institute in France was created on the campus in 2005 with the cooperation of Nanchang University and Jiujiang University.

After having managed its payroll and budget since January 1, 2010, the University of Poitiers is the third university in France to have its premises.

In late 2011 the university changed its logo. They submitted four so that students and the staff were able to decide. The up-to-date logo is based on the original coat of arms while the former was something modern. Over 9,000 people participated in the selection of the new logo.

In 2012, the university launched a blogging platform where the teaching staff and researchers deal with topical subjects, each in their area of expertise. The slogan is the word of experts.

Organization

The university covers all major academic fields through its 14 teaching and research departments, institutes and schools:

Teaching and Research Departments 
Department of Law and Social Sciences 
Department of Economics 
Department of Basic and Applied Science 
Department of Literature and Languages 
Department of Human Sciences and Arts 
Department of Sports Sciences 
Department of Medicine and Pharmacy
School
Graduate Engineering School - École nationale supérieure d'ingénieurs de Poitiers (ENSIP)
Institutes 
Polytechnic of Poitiers (IUT) 
Polytechnic of Angoulême (IUT)
IAE University Business School (IAE Poitiers)
Institute of Communication and New Technologies (ICOMTEC)
General Administration Preparatory Institute (IPAG)
Institute of Industrial, Insurance and Financial Risks (IRIAF)

Research 
In the scientific domain, it has these laboratories, where ENSIP is part of:
 LIAS: automatics
 IC2MP: chemistry and materials
 Institut Pprime: physics

In the legal domain, the Center for Studies on International Legal Cooperation (CECOJI) is a joint research unit (UMR) involving the University of Poitiers and the National Center for Scientific Research (CNRS).

Life on campus 

Students can play in athletic teams, or just enjoy all the sports proposed. It is also possible to play golf at the north of the campus of Poitiers and sail in La Rochelle.

The Bitards are also known as the university's most famous student association.

Notable people
Abderrazak El Albani
Michel Brunet
John Howard Griffin
Mostafa Mir-Salim

Points of interest
Jardin botanique universitaire de Poitiers

See also
 Bitard
 List of medieval universities

Notes and references

External links
 Official website 

 
Public universities in France
Universities and colleges in Poitiers
1431 establishments in Europe
1430s establishments in France
Educational institutions established in the 15th century